David Gus "Buddy" Bell (born August 27, 1951) is an American former third baseman and manager in Major League Baseball (MLB) currently serving as vice president and senior advisor to the general manager for the Cincinnati Reds.  

After an 18-year career with four teams, most notably the Cleveland Indians, the Texas Rangers, and the Cincinnati Reds, he managed the Detroit Tigers, Colorado Rockies and Kansas City Royals for three seasons each and served as Vice President/Assistant General Manager for the Chicago White Sox.  He was a five-time MLB All-Star and won six consecutive Rawlings Gold Glove Awards from 1979–1984.

He is the son of outfielder Gus Bell and the father of former third basemen Mike and David Bell, making them one of five families to have three generations play in the Major Leagues. When David was named Reds manager in October 2018, he and Buddy became the fourth father-son pair to serve as major league managers, joining George and Dick Sisler, Bob and Joel Skinner, and Bob and Aaron Boone.

Biography
Bell was born while his father was playing for the Pittsburgh Pirates. He was drafted in 1969 by the Indians and was regarded as a promising prospect from the beginning. The ,  Bell was a solid, but not overpowering, right-handed hitter on a mostly lackluster Indians team. He was named to the All-Star team in 1973.

After the  season Bell was traded to the Texas Rangers in exchange for Toby Harrah – another solid, veteran third baseman. From 1979 through 1984, Bell won the Gold Glove for third base in the American League. He also won the Silver Slugger Award in 1984. He finished in the top ten in batting average in 1980 and 1984.

In fielding, Bell was spectacular and often played far off the third base line, taking many base hits from opposing batters. In Total zone runs (a defensive statistic) he is 9th all time (ahead of Willie Mays) and 2nd among all third baseman (behind Brooks Robinson).  His Range factor (another defensive stat) is 5th all-time among 3rd baseman.  He was in the top 10 in fielding pct. 10 times and finished first 3 times.

In the middle of the  season, Bell was sent to the Cincinnati Reds, where his father had been a popular player in the 1950s. Buddy responded with two more solid years playing for second place teams under Pete Rose. In , he hit a career-high 20 home runs. In the  season he began to fade and was traded to the Houston Astros. Bell was released in December and returned with the Rangers before the  season, in which he appeared sparingly. In an 18-year career, Bell posted a .279 batting average with 201 home runs and 1106 RBI in 2405 games. He won six Gold Gloves, and made five All-Star Game appearances.

Following retirement, Bell worked for several years as a coach for the Reds, and from 1994-95 for the Indians. He managed the Detroit Tigers from 1996–98. He then managed the Colorado Rockies from  through part of  when he was fired in April after a 6-16 start. As a manager both for Detroit and Colorado, Bell compiled a 184-277 record.

In November , Bell returned to coaching for the Cleveland Indians. On May 31, 2005, the Kansas City Royals hired Bell as their manager, three weeks after Tony Peña resigned. Bell won his first four games as a manager, becoming only the second Royals manager (after Whitey Herzog) to do so and guiding the Royals to their first four-game winning streak since .

Bell took a medical leave of absence from the team on September 20, 2006, after a lump was discovered on his tonsils. Bell had experienced difficulty swallowing in the previous weeks,  and went to the Mayo Clinic in Scottsdale, Arizona following the advice of Royals medical staff. On August 1, 2007, Bell announced that he would not be returning to the Royals bench at the conclusion of the 2007 season. Bell stated that his decision was his own, not based on pressure from the Royals front office, and that he wished to spend more time with his family.

Managerial record

See also

 Houston Astros award winners and league leaders
 List of Major League Baseball career doubles leaders
 List of Major League Baseball career runs scored leaders
 List of Major League Baseball career runs batted in leaders
 Third-generation Major League Baseball families
 List of second-generation Major League Baseball players

References

External links

Buddy Bell at Baseball Biography
Buddy Bell at Pura Pelota (Venezuelan Professional Baseball League)

1951 births
Living people
American League All-Stars
Baseball players from Pittsburgh
Cardenales de Lara players
American expatriate baseball players in Venezuela
Chicago White Sox executives
Cleveland Indians coaches
Cleveland Indians players
Cincinnati Reds players
Colorado Rockies managers
Detroit Tigers managers
Gold Glove Award winners
Gulf Coast Indians players
Houston Astros players
Kansas City Royals managers
Major League Baseball third basemen
Miami RedHawks baseball players
Silver Slugger Award winners
Sportspeople from Pittsburgh
Sumter Indians players
Texas Rangers players
United States national baseball team managers
Wichita Aeros players
Baseball players from Cincinnati